Daron Norwood is the self-titled debut studio album by American country music singer Daron Norwood. It was released on February 1, 1994 via Giant Records. The album includes the singles "If It Wasn't for Her I Wouldn't Have You", "Cowboys Don't Cry", and "If I Ever Love Again", of which the first two were top 40 hits on the Hot Country Songs chart. "Cowboys Don't Cry" was originally released by Dude Mowrey on his 1991 album Honky Tonk. Both "Phonographic Memory" and "If I Ever Love Again" were originally recorded by their co-writer Curtis Wright on his 1992 self-titled album.

Critical reception
The album received a mostly-favorable review in Billboard, which praised Norwood's "pleasantly resonant voice" and said that he "displays both his songwriting potential and an engaging way with a ballad." Brian Mansfield rated the album 2.5 out of 5 stars in New Country magazine, praising Norwood's "natural quaver that often makes him sound like he's two steps from tears" and highlighting the singles as being among the strongest cuts, but overall criticizing the album as "too familiar."

Track listing

Personnel
Compiled from liner notes.

Musicians
 David Briggs — strings
 Larry Byrom — acoustic guitar
 Sonny Garrish — steel guitar
 Dann Huff — electric guitar
 Gary Prim — keyboards
 Joe Spivey — fiddle
 Jimmy Tipton — electric guitar
 Lonnie Wilson — drums
 Curtis Wright — background vocals
 Glenn Worf — bass guitar
 Curtis Young — background vocals

Technical
 Jeff Carlton — production
 Julian King — engineering
 Glenn Meadows — mastering
 Lee Peterzell — engineering
 Lynn Peterzell — engineering
 James Stroud — production

Recorded and mixed at Loud Recording Studios, Nashville, Tennessee.

References

1994 debut albums
Daron Norwood albums
Albums produced by James Stroud
Giant Records (Warner) albums